Josef Winkler may refer to:

 Josef Winkler (writer) (born 1953), Austrian writer
 Josef Winkler (politician) (born 1974), German politician